Matayoshi Kobudo is a general term referring to the style of Okinawan Kobudo that was developed by Matayoshi Shinpo (又吉眞豊) and Matayoshi Shinko (又吉眞光) during the twentieth century. Martial arts have been practiced by the Matayoshi family for over nine generations and draw influence from Japanese, Chinese and indigenous Okinawan martial arts styles.

History
In the early 20th century Matayoshi Shinko 又吉眞光 was asked to demonstrate Kobudo to the Japanese emperor. He did this twice alongside the likes of Chojun Miyagi and Gichin Funakoshi, who demonstrated karate.

Following the death of Matayoshi Shinko in 1947, his son Shinpo, continued his father's legacy by teaching kobudo. Matayoshi Shinpo started a dojo in the 1970s in memory of his father and called it the Kodokan 光道館. From the Kodokan he taught a wide variety of traditional weapons associated with Okinawan peasants. In 1972, Matayoshi Sensei created the Zen Okinawan Kobudo Renmei as an organisation dedicated to the teaching and studying of Okinawa Kobudo. Following the death of Shinpo Matayoshi in 1997, Matayoshi Kobudo practitioners now find themselves split into different organisations.

Thanks to the extensive teaching of Matayoshi Shinpo and his students, Matayoshi Kobudo has great influence and respect around the world and an estimated 2000 dojos can now be found worldwide.

Weapons and kata 
 Bō (6 ft Staff) - Shushi no kun, Choun no kun, Sakugawa no kun, Tsuken (Chikin) no kun, Shishi no kun,
 Sai (Small Trident) - Matayoshi No Sai Dai Ichi (Nicho Sai), Matayoshi No Sai Dai Ni (Sancho Sai), Shinbaru no sai
 Tunkuwa (sometimes called Tonfa) (Wooden Side handled Batton) - Matayoshi No Tunkuwa Dai Ichi, Matayoshi No Tunkuwa Dai Ni
 Nunchaku (Threshing short staff) - Nunchaku No Kata
 Sansetsukon (Three Sectional Staff) - Sansetsukun No Kata Ichi and Ni
 Eku (Boat Oar) - Chikin Akachu No Eku Di
 Nunti-Bo (Spear) - NuntiBo No Kata
 Tinbei+Seiryuto (Shield+short sword) - Timbei No Kata
 Kama (Short sickles) - Kama Nu Ti
 Suruchin (Weighted rope / Chain) - Suruchin No Kata
 Kuwa (Hoe) -  Kuwa Nu Ti
 Jo (Stick) -  Jojutsu no kata
 Tekko (brass knuckles) -  Tekko no kata
 Tecchyu (iron cylinder) -  Tecchyu no kata
 KurumanBo (asymmetrical jointed stick) -  KurumanBo no kata

Matayoshi Soke lineage 
The Matayoshi Family Home is above the Kodokan dojo in Naha Okinawa. Matayoshi Yasushi (the only son of Shinpo) is the spiritual head of the Kodokan as appointed by his father but he has never practiced Matayoshi Kobudo. At the time of his death, Matayoshi Sensei's next in line for technical competence was Yoshiaki Gakiya.

Family lineage:

 19th century
 Shingin Matayoshi
 Shintoku Matayoshi
 Shinchin Matayoshi 
 Shinko Matayoshi (1888-1947)

 20th century
 Shinko Matayoshi (1888-1947)
 Shinpo Matayoshi (1921-1997)
 Yasushi Matayoshi (present day)

 21st century
 Yasushi Matayoshi (present day)

Tha Matayoshi Kobudo Headquarters is in Naha, Okinawa.

Matayoshi Lineage Associations 
Dojos operating under the All Okinawa Kobudo Federation (zen okinawa kobudo renmei, founded by Matayoshi Shinpo) :
 Ryuseikan, of Kinjo Kenichi
 Kanegusuku Shubukan, Gaja Takehiro
 Gibo Dojo, Gibo Seiki
 Azuma Shunji
 Miyagi Koki
 Taira Yoshio
 Takushi Seiki

Official branches of the kodokan honbu dojo:
 Osaka Sakai Shureikan, Murayama Seitetsu
 Kodokan Nagoya Shibu, Ishido Hidehiko
 Hayasaka Yoshifumi (Tokyo area)
 Kamura Koshin (Naha)

Former students of Master Matayoshi, who have split voluntarily or were expelled after 1997 :
 Seisho Itokazu: Matayoshi Kobudo Shinbukai
 Yoshiyaki Gakiya, now Neil Stolsmark: Okinawa Kobudo Doushi Rensei-kai (co-founder was Josei Yogi)
 Josei Yogi: Okinawa Kobudo Renseikai
 Ryukyu Kobudo shureikan: Shusei Maeshiro (in association with Tsuneo Shimabukuro)
 Mikio Nishiuchi: International Okinawa Kobudo Association USA
 Nippon Budo Club, Seisuke Adaniya
 Komesu Yamashiro dojo, Kenichi Yamashiro (originally Kodokan Komesu shibu)
 Kobudo Shurei no kuni, Hidetada Ishiki (in association with Kenichi Yamashiro)

Former students of Master Matayoshi, who have split voluntarily or were expelled before 1997 :
 Tetsuhiro Hokama: Kenshikai Karatedo Kobudo Association
 Takashi Kinjo: Okinawa Budo Kokusai Renmei and the Okinawa Kobukai
 Kenyu Chinen: World Oshu-Kai Dento Okinawa Shorin-Ryu Karate Do Kobudo Federation
 Zenei Oshiro: Academie Internationale de kobudo d'Okinawa

Gray-zone of the foreigners :
 Arthur Moulas, Matayoshi Kobudo Australia
 Andrea Guarelli: International Matayoshi kobudo Association
 Franco Sanguinetti: Matayoshi Kobudo Kodokan International
 Kimo Wall (1943-2018): Okinawa Kodokan
 Guy Juille
 Patrick Rault
 Frédéric Guérin : Uchina-di club

References 
 Kenyu Chinen, Kobudo d'Okinawa
 Andrea Guarelli, Okinawan Kobudo: The History, Tools, and Techniques of the Ancient Martial Art
 Zenei Oshiro, Kobudo d'Okinawa: Bo et Tonfa

External links 
 International Matayoshi Kobudo Association
 Okinawa Kobudo Doushi Rensei-kai
 Matayoshi Kobudo Kodokan International
 Okinawa Kobudo Renseikai
 

Okinawan kobudo